dg nanouk okpik is an Inuit poet, specifically Iñupiaq. She received the American Book Award for her debut poetry collection, Corpse Whale (2012).

Education 
Born in Anchorage and raised by Irish / German adoptive parents, dg nanouk okpik has experienced some of the same hardships faced by other Indigenous women, including urban relocation, poverty and disrupted access to her culture. She attended the University of Southern Maine, earning an MFA. She was the recipient of the Truman Capote Literary Trust Scholarship. She is also an alumna of the Institute of American Indian Arts.

Career 
okpik is a resident advisor at the Santa Fe Indian School. She received the American Book Award for her debut poetry collection, Corpse Whale, which was published in 2012 and received praise from critics. In a review for Studies in American Indian Literatures, Jasmine Johnston described Corpse Whale as "both surreal and mythic", praising okpik's imagery and code-switching between Inuit and English. Diego Báez, writing for Booklist, called it a "captivating debut" and similarly commended okpik's use of Inuit vocabulary.

okpik's writing has been widely anthologized. Among collections including her is The Poem Is You: 60 Contemporary American Poems and How to Read Them by literary critic and poet Stephanie Burt. Her poetry was also part of the collection Sing: Poetry from the Indigenous Americas by Allison Adelle Hedge Coke. as well as Effigies: An Anthology of New Indigenous Writing by the same author.

Awards

Personal life 
She was raised in Anchorage, Alaska, and currently lives in Santa Fe, New Mexico.

Published works

Monographs
2012: Corpse Whale (University of Arizona Press), 
2022: Blood Snow (Wave Books),

Anthologies
 2018: New Poets of Native Nations (Graywolf Press), ed. Heid E. Erdrich, 
 2011: Sing: Poetry from the Indigenous Americas (University of Arizona Press), 
 2009: Effigies: An Anthology of Indigenous Writing from the Pacific Rim (Salt Publishing),

Selected poetry
2009: "For-The-Spirits-Who-Have-Rounded-The-Bend IIVAQSAAT"
2012: "Cell Block on Chena River"
2012: "Warming"
2012: "If Oil is Drilled in Bristol Bay"
2012: "The Pact with Samna"
2012: "Little Brother and the Serpent Samna"
2018: "A Year Dot"
2018: "Necklaced Whalebone"
2018: "Found"
2020: "When White Hawks Come"

References

External links
 The poet reading at Salish Kootenai College: https://www.youtube.com/watch?v=CTmpbxvXfKY
 New Milford Public Library reading: https://www.youtube.com/watch?v=eeP4Vq4WK3k
 Blue Sky Gallery reads and analyzes poetry by dg nanouk okpik and Kiliii Yuyan: https://www.youtube.com/watch?v=_7R6e7eX9XA

Living people
21st-century American poets
American Book Award winners
American women poets
Institute of American Indian Arts alumni
Native American poets
Poets from Alaska
University of Southern Maine alumni
Writers from Anchorage, Alaska
Year of birth missing (living people)
21st-century American women